The women's 400 metres hurdles at the 2008 Summer Olympics took place on 17–20 August at the Beijing National Stadium.

The qualifying standards were 55.60 s (A standard) and 56.50 s (B standard).

Schedule
All times are China Standard Time (UTC+8)

Records
Prior to this competition, the existing world and Olympic records were as follows:

The following new Olympic record was set during this competition.

Results

Round 1

The first three runners of each heat (Q) plus the next four overall fastest runners (q) qualified for the Semifinals.

Semifinals
Qualification: First 4 in each heat (Q)   advance to the Final.

Final

(OR = Olympic record; NR = National Record; PB = Personal Best; SB = Season Best.)

References

Athletics at the 2008 Summer Olympics
400 metres hurdles at the Olympics
2008 in women's athletics
Women's events at the 2008 Summer Olympics